St Enda's G.A.C, Glengormley. is a Gaelic Athletic Association club from Glengormley, County Antrim, Northern Ireland. They cater for gaelic football, hurling and camogie.

History

Founded in 1956 by local gaels, Edward Sherry, Tony Colaluca, Christy Mannion, Austin Hinds, Paddy Laverty, Sean Hayes and Brendan and Seamus Boylan amongst others, St Enda's have grown from a small rural club to the biggest GAA club in the province of Ulster which is the social and cultural epicentre of the local community, often in the face of violent adversity.

In the late 1950s, Henry Campbell who owned land on the Hightown Road offered one of his fields as a pitch to play on. Subsequently, the club moved to another of Campbell's fields, which was bought for £5000 in 1972. In the same year the club won its first major trophy when they won the Junior Championship. The teams in the 1970s were back-boned by the many families in the club to mention a few, the McCreas, Devlins, Burns, Hinds's, Farrells, Hamills, Duffys, Lemons, Lawell family and the O'Conners.

Further achievements followed winning Division 4 Hurling; The Junior Hurling Championship, 1990, 1992,2012; Division 3 All County Football, 1975; Division 3 Football again in 1984, Division 2 Football in 1987, 1989, 2002 playoff final and the All County 7-a-side tournament in 2001.

The club continued to develop despite the many attacks on the club during the troubles, the club premises being destroyed in 1972 and badly damaged in 1983.  Mr. Devlin, whose family was involved in the club, was shot and killed at the entrance to the club. A housing development opportunity in the mid-1980s allowed the club after negotiations with a developer to purchase with the help of grant aid the site of the new pitch and clubrooms. The President of the G.A.A., Seosamh Mac Donncha officially opened the new pitch and clubrooms on 4 May 1998.

At underage level St Enda's have progressed, winning divisional medals at all age levels throughout the years. The dedication of all juvenile mentors has continued down the years, the importance of an active juvenile section being the lifeblood of the club.

Over the past 5 years or so traditional cultural activities have played a large part in the life of the club. A School of Music infuses the gra of traditional music to many youngsters weekly, with vibrant tin whistle, fiddle and bodhran lessons, complementing the beat of the tackle and clash of the ash on the pitch. In 2003, members Ciaran McCavana, Dara Woods and Niall Murphy furthered the aims of a previous committee which sought to promote the Irish language in a practical and beneficial way by joining the Irish language education revolution which is sweeping Belfast and the rest of the north. Naiscoil Eanna, the first Irish language nursery school in Glengormley, opened in September 2004. A Bunscoil was then opened in September 2007

Honours
 Antrim Intermediate Football Championship: (1)
 2018
 Ulster Intermediate Club Football Championship: (1)
 2018
 Antrim Junior Football Championship: (1)
 1972

External links
St Enda's Club Website

Gaelic games clubs in County Antrim
Gaelic football clubs in County Antrim
Hurling clubs in County Antrim
Newtownabbey